Saari Bhool Hamari Thi is a 2013 Pakistani drama serial directed by Siraj-ul-Haque which aired on Geo TV on Wednesday and Thursday nights at 9:00 p.m. The first episode was aired on 21 August 2013. The serial is written by Rahat Jabeen, produced by 7th Sky Entertainment. It stars Ayeza Khan, Danish Taimoor, Farhan Ali Agha, Affan Waheed and Anum Fayyaz in lead roles.

Cast 
Farhan Ali Agha as Mohsin
Ayeza Khan as Arisha
Danish Taimoor as Subhan
Aliee Shaikh as Subhan Elder brother
Affan Waheed as Abrar
Shaista Jabeen as Abrar's Mother
Asma Abbas as Hameeda
Anum Fayyaz as Maryam
Uroosa Qureshi as Fatima
Sohail Asghar as Barkat Hussain
Ismat Zaidi as Mohsin's Mother

References

External links 

Saari Bhool Hamari Thi Archives
Picasso-entertainment

Pakistani television series